Hanumanpur is a village in Angul district, Kaniha block, Odisha, India.

References

External links

Villages in Angul district